Parklands Hotel (officially Parklands Boutique Hotel with Dining) is an historic building in Perth, Perth and Kinross, Scotland. Located on St Leonard's Bank, it is a Category C listed building comprising two villas that have been combined into one business. When viewed from St Leonard's Bank, the villa on the left (closest to King's Place) dates to the 19th century, the one on the right to the 18th century. It is also close to Perth bus station.

The properties, which were previously the Atholl Hotel and Inch Park Hotel, overlook the northwestern corner of the city's South Inch. It has fifteen bedrooms. The hotel's bistro is named No.1 Bank. A double-AA rosette restaurant, it was formerly named 63@Parklands, a sister restaurant to executive chef and Blairgowrie native Graeme Pallister's 63 Tay Street, which was established in 2007. No.1 The Bank opened a beer garden in the summer of 2020.

St Leonard's Bank, originally called Marshall's Bank, was laid out by the city's architect William Macdonald Mackenzie in 1828 on land which belonged to the Glover Incorporation.

Parklands, Perth's only four-star-rated hotel, has been owned since 2003 by Scott and Penny Edwards.

See also
List of listed buildings in Perth, Scotland

References

External links
Parklands Hotel official website
Perth, 2 St Leonards Bank, Inch Park Hotel – Canmore
A view of the properties from King's Place – Google Street View, March 2019

18th-century establishments in Scotland
19th-century establishments in Scotland
Listed buildings in Perth, Scotland
Category C listed buildings in Perth and Kinross
Listed hotels in Scotland
Hotels in Perth and Kinross